Bruce Malmuth (February 4, 1934 – June 29, 2005) was an American film director, best known for his work in the action and thriller genres and for his acting role in The Karate Kid film franchise.

Biography

Early life
Malmuth was the brother of aeronautical engineer Norman Malmuth and Daniel S. Malmuth, an executive for Columbia Pictures and second unit director. Malmuth began making documentaries while serving in the Army, where he met baseball announcer Walter Red Barber. After his military career, Malmuth directed the New York Yankee games at WPIX radio before entering the film and television industry.

Film and television career
Malmuth's directoral debut was Fore Play, an anthology comedy film which he co-directed with John G. Avildsen. He was best known for directing Sylvester Stallone in the 1981 thriller Nighthawks and Steven Seagal in the 1990 political action film Hard to Kill and The Man Who Wasn't There, starring Steve Guttenberg.

An avid sports and martial arts fan, Malmuth played the role of ring announcer in 1984's The Karate Kid, among other small film roles. He also worked on the television series Beauty and the Beast and the Emmy-winning ABC Afterschool Special A Boy's Dream, which featured Darryl Strawberry.

Death
On June 29, 2005, at Cedars-Sinai Medical Center, Malmuth died at the age of 71 of esophageal cancer. His son, Evan Malmuth, whom he raised as a single father, is an actor and writer.

Filmography

References

External links
 

1934 births
2005 deaths
American film directors
Deaths from esophageal cancer
Deaths from cancer in California
Burials at Mount Sinai Memorial Park Cemetery
Action film directors